The Taipei City Hall, the seat of Taipei City government, is located at Xinyi Special District, Xinyi District, Taipei, Taiwan.

The height of building is 54.42 m, the floor area is 196,684.59m2, and it comprises 12 floors above ground, as well as 2 basement levels.

History
The city hall building was established in 1994.

Architecture
The Taipei City Hall building is a 12-story architecture with a total floor space of about 197,000 m2, capable of accommodating 6,000 employees. The building also often houses exhibitions, performances, speeches, etc.

See also
 New Taipei City Hall
 Taipei City Hall Bus Station
 Taipei City Hall MRT station

References

1986 establishments in Taiwan
Government buildings completed in 1994
City and town halls in Taiwan
Buildings and structures in Taipei
Xinyi Special District
Government of Taipei